The 1998 Karl Schäfer Memorial (also known as the Vienna Cup) took place from October 7 through 10th, 1998. Skaters competed in the disciplines of men's singles, ladies' singles, and ice dancing.

Results

Men

Ladies

Ice dancing

External links
 1998 Karl Schäfer Memorial

Karl Schäfer Memorial
Karl Schafer Memorial, 1998
Karl Schafer Memorial